Evelyn Scott may refer to:

 Evelyn Scott (activist) (1935 – 2017), Australian educator and activist
 Evelyn Scott (writer) (1893–1963), American novelist, playwright and poet
 Evelyn Scott (actress) (1915–2002), American actress

See also 
 Evelyn Scott School